Hortense Flexner King (April 12, 1885 – September 28, 1973) was an American poet, playwright, and professor.

Life 
She attended Bryn Mawr College. She graduated from the University of Michigan, with a B.A. in 1907, and a M.A. in 1910.
She worked for the Louisville Herald. She worked with her sisters, Jennie Maas Flexner and Carolyn A. Flexner, in getting the vote out in Louisville when Kentucky women won the right to vote in school board elections in 1912.

She married Wyncie King (1884–1961).
They moved to Philadelphia. He was a contributor to the Saturday Evening Post.
She taught at Bryn Mawr, from 1926 to 1940, and at Sarah Lawrence College from 1942 to 1950. They were friends of Susan Clay Sawitzky, and Martha Gellhorn.

In 1961, she returned to Louisville.
Marguerite Yourcenar translated her poetry into French.

Her papers are held at the University of Louisville.

She is buried alongside her husband in the Sutton Island Cemetery, in Cranberry Isles, Maine.

Works 
Poetry
Clouds and Cobblestones 1920.
The Stubborn Root and Other Poems (1930)
North Window and Other Poems (1943)
Poems (1961)
Selected Poems (1963), with an introduction by English poet Laurie Lee
Marguerite Yourcenar (ed.) Presentation Critique d'Hortense Flexner Suivie d'un Choix de Poems (1969),
The Selected Poems of Hortense Flexner (1975)
Half a Star: Poems by Hortense Flexner

Plays
Voices (1916)
Mahogany (1921)
The Faun (1921)
The Broken God
The Road
The Little Miracle
Three Wise Men of Gotham

References

External links 
https://archive.today/20130626181417/http://www.slc.edu/magazine/money/fromthearchives.html
https://pinemountainsettlement.net/?page_id=14418 Scrapbook Before 1929: Hortense Flexner "Are You Too Old to Learn ?..."
 

1885 births
1973 deaths
University of Michigan alumni
Bryn Mawr College faculty
Sarah Lawrence College faculty
American women poets
Poets from Kentucky
Writers from Louisville, Kentucky
American women dramatists and playwrights
20th-century American poets
20th-century American dramatists and playwrights
20th-century American women writers
American women academics